The Mayor of Onehunga officiated over the Onehunga Borough of New Zealand, which was administered by the Onehunga Borough Council. The office existed from 1877 until 1989, when Onehunga Borough and was amalgamated into the new Auckland City Council as part of the 1989 local government reforms. There were 24 holders of the office.

In 1894 Elizabeth Yates was elected Mayor of Onehunga becoming the first female mayor anywhere in the British Empire and second in the world.

List of mayors
Mayors of Onehunga were:

Key

References

Onehunga
Mayors of places in the Auckland Region
People from Onehunga